Harold Paul Rico (April 29, 1925 – January 16, 2004) was an FBI agent. Indicted for murder in 2003 but never found guilty. He was accused of the 1968 framing of four men for murder but died before his trial would have taken place.

Early life
Rico was born in 1925 in Boston. He graduated from Boston College with a bachelor's degree in history. Rico joined the FBI in 1951 at the age of 26 and worked in the Boston area. He used members of the Winter Hill Gang as informants. In 1956 he recognized fugitive bank robber James "Whitey" Bulger in a Revere bar and arrested him.

Deegan murder
In 1965, Rico received word that gangster Edward "Teddy" Deegan had been murdered by Italian-American hitman Vincent Flemmi under orders from Winter Hill Gang boss Howie Winter. Rico then watched as Portuguese-American hitman Joe Barboza committed perjury and claimed that he had committed Deegan's murder under orders from four made men in the Patriarca crime family: Peter Limone, underboss Henry Tameleo, Joe Salvati and Louis Greco. Tameleo died in 1985 in prison and Greco died in 1995 in prison, too; Salvati was released in 1997, and Limone in 2001. When interrogated during U.S. House Judiciary Committee hearings in October 2003 about the four wrongful convictions, an enraged Rico responded, "What do you want, tears?"

The two survivors and the estates of the deceased were awarded $101.7 million in damages by U.S. District Judge Nancy Gertner in Boston on July 26, 2007.

Patriarca family murder trial
Rico was in charge of cooperative witness John "Red" Kelley, an Irish American mobster and sometime associate of the Patriarca crime family, during a murder trial of family boss Raymond Patriarca and four members of the family, Maurice Lerner, Robert Fairbrothers, John Rossi, and Rudolph Sciarra. The five were tried in 1970 for murder and conspiracy to commit murder in the 1968 shotgun murders of Rudolph "Rudy" Marfeo and Anthony Melei.  Kelley testified he had been contracted by Lerner to kill Marfeo and Melei, whom Kelley and Lerner allegedly murdered.  After the trial, Kelley went into the federal witness protection program.

Patriarca and his associates were convicted of conspiracy to commit murder and were sentenced to 10 years in prison. Lerner also was convicted of two counts of murder for which he was sentenced to two life terms in addition to the ten years for conspiracy, all of the sentences to be served consecutively.  The jury was unable to reach a verdict for the other four defendants. Lerner's conviction  subsequently was quashed by the Rhode Island Supreme Court in 1988. It had been established that Kelley had perjured himself at the trial, as had Rico, who had corroborated Kelley's testimony.  The Court vacated his conviction and ordered a new trial.

Murder indictment and death
On October 9, 2003, Rico was indicted for murder in Oklahoma and Florida for persuading Bulger and Stephen Flemmi to sanction the murder of Oklahoma City millionaire Roger Wheeler on May 27, 1981. Rico died on January 16, 2004, in a Tulsa hospital where he was moved to from prison, still under indictment for the 1981 murder. He was 78.

See also
Murder of Edward Deegan

References

External links 
 FBI Dark Secrets, by Clarence Walker
 RICO How Politicians, Prosecutors and the Mob Destroyed One of the FBI's Finest Special Agents, by Joe Wolfinger and Chris Kerr with Jerry Seper

1925 births
2004 deaths
Morrissey College of Arts & Sciences alumni
American people who died in prison custody
Police misconduct in the United States
Prisoners who died in Oklahoma detention
Winter Hill Gang
People from Boston
Federal Bureau of Investigation misconduct